Clyde is a suburb of Melbourne, Victoria, Australia, 48 km south-east of Melbourne's Central Business District, located within the City of Casey local government area. Clyde recorded a population of 11,177 at the 2021 census.

History

Clyde Post Office on the Berwick-Cranbourne Road opened on 25 January 1864. In 1915 it was renamed Clyde North, and Clyde Railway Station office (open since 1888) was renamed Clyde.

Description

The town centre is located in a small triangle between Twyford Road, Clyde-Five Ways Road and Ballarto Road and contains a primary school, CFA fire station, general store and community hall. Nearby are the Inghams poultry feed mill, built in 1979, and Lineham Oval, a sports oval which is home to the Clyde club in the West Gippsland Cricket Association.

Transport

Clyde railway station was formerly situated on the South Gippsland railway corridor that operated to its terminus at Yarram in the early 1980s and Leongatha in the mid-1990s. A V/Line road coach service replaced the rail service to Leongatha on July 24, 1993, running between Melbourne and Yarram. However, since the closure of the South Gippsland rail line—with the exception of the locally run tourist railway between Nyora and Leongatha—by the Kennett Victorian government on December 14, 1994, the South and West Gippsland Transport Group represented by the local council are campaigning for the rail services to be reinstated beyond the current terminus at Cranbourne by the 2020s, which was promised by the Bracks government in 1999.

On 31 January 2018, a council in Melbourne's booming South-east says it needs almost $3 Billion worth of rail and road infrastructure to bring its transport services including the electrification to Clyde from Cranbourne.

See also
 City of Cranbourne – Clyde was previously within this former local government area.

References

Suburbs of the City of Casey